Laas Geel, also spelled Laas Gaal, are cave formations on the rural outskirts of Hargeisa, Somaliland, situated in the Maroodi Jeex region of the country. They contain some of the earliest known cave paintings of domesticated African aurochs (Bos primigenius africanus) in the Horn of Africa. Laas Geel's rock art is estimated to date to circa 3,500-2,500 BCE.

Discovery

During November and December 2002, an archaeological survey was carried out in Somaliland by a French team of researchers. The expedition's objective was to search for rock shelters and caves that contained archaeological sediments and infills in order to document the historical period when production economy appeared in this part of the Horn of Africa (circa 5,000 to 2,000  years BCE). During the course of the survey, the excavation team discovered the Laas Geel cave paintings, that encompass an area of ten rock alcoves (caves). In an excellent state of preservation, the rock art depicts wild animals and decorated cattle (cows and bulls). They also feature herders, who are believed to be the creators of the paintings. Laas Geel's rock art is executed in the same distinctive Ethiopian-Arabian style as the Dhambalin and Karinhegane cave paintings that are also situated in Somaliland.

Although the Laas Geel rock art had been known to the area's inhabitants for centuries, its existence only came to international attention after the 2002 discovery. In November 2003, a mission returned to Laas Geel and a team of experts undertook a detailed study of the paintings in their prehistoric context.

Somaliland in general, is home to numerous such archaeological sites and megalithic structures, with similar rock art found at Haadh, Gudmo Biyo Cas, Dhambalin, Dhagah Maroodi and numerous other sites, while ancient edifices are, among others, found at Sheikh, Aynabo, Aw-Barkhadle, Ancient Amud, Heis, Maydh, Haylan, Qa’ableh, Qombo'ul and El Ayo. However, many of these old structures have yet to be properly explored, a process which would help shed further light on local history and facilitate their preservation for posterity.

Description
The Laas Geel cave paintings are thought to be some of the most vivid rock art in Africa. Among other things, they depict cattle in ceremonial robes accompanied by humans, who are believed to have been inhabitants of the region. The necks of the cattle are embellished with a kind of plastron. Some of the cattle are also portrayed wearing decorative robes. Besides long-horned cattle, the rock art also shows an image of a domesticated dog, several paintings of Canidae as well as a giraffe. The site is excellently preserved due to the location of the paintings which are covered by the granite overhangs.

Gallery
 The word laas geel consist of two words according to Somali languages which is laas and geel, the word laas means well and the word geel means camel in Somali. Well refers to a source of water which camels and other livestock drink from as well as the people.

See also
 Caves in Somaliland
 Dhambalin
 Dhaymoole
 History of Somaliland

References

External links

 CyArk - Rock Art Sites of Somalia

Archaeological sites in Somaliland
Caves of Somaliland
Rock art in Africa
Prehistoric Africa